Tenguella (also known as Temelá) was the founder of the Empire of Great Fulo.  He was responsible, along with his son, for the Fula migration to the Gambia.  He was named Great Fulo or Great king of the Fulos in Portuguese documents of the time.

Background
The Fula are a West African nomadic people.  They had been moving south within the Mali Empire since the thirteenth century. They had generally submitted to the laws of the settled farmers in the region and so had avoided large confrontations.  By the end of the 15th Century, they had a strong presence in Futa Tooro, Macina, Fouta Djallon and Bondu.

Reign
Tenguella became chief of the Fula in 1464. Conflict with the Mali Empire started around 1480.  The fighting escalated and Tenguella built up an army which included a strong and effective cavalry force.  In response, in 1490 Mansa Mahmud II requested an alliance and firearms from Portugal to fight the Fula, but these were not forthcoming.  It was at this time that Tenguella became known as the Great Fulo.  He consolidated his power by constructing a major fortress in Fouta Djallon. Leaving his son in charge of it, he led his forces to fight the Songhai Empire who had been trying to control the gold mines of Bambouk, source of much of the wealth of Mali. The Fula and the Songhai clashed at Diarra in 1512. Tenguella was defeated and killed by Amar Kondjago, a brother of the Askia Mohammad I.

Succession
At his death, Tenguella was succeeded by his son Koli Tenguella who founded the Denianke Dynasty.

References

 
Fula people
15th-century monarchs in Africa
Year of birth unknown
1512 deaths